is a Japanese voice actor and singer. He is affiliated with 81 Produce. He has voiced in a number of lead roles in anime shows, including Kazuya Kujo in Gosick, Yoshiharu Sagara in The Ambition of Oda Nobuna, Kon Hokaze in Ixion Saga DT, Hachiman Hikigaya in My Youth Romantic Comedy Is Wrong, As I Expected, William Twining in Devils and Realist, Yuuji Terushima in Haikyuu!!, Takeo Gōda in My Love Story, and Loid Forger in Spy × Family. He won the Best New Actor Award at the 6th Seiyu Awards, and the Best Lead Actor Award and Most Valuable Seiyū Award at the 17th Seiyu Awards. He won Best Voice Actor in the Newtype Anime Awards 2015. Eguchi launched a manga about his life called Eguchi Takuya no Gainen Planet in 2017, published on Kadokawa's Dengeki Girl's Style Online website.

Filmography

Anime

Film

Tokusatsu

Video games

Drama CD

Dubbing

TV Show

Character song

References

External links
  
 

1987 births
81 Produce voice actors
Japanese male voice actors
Japanese male video game actors
Living people
Male voice actors from Setagaya
Seiyu Award winners